The Telefomin incident occurred in November 1953 in Papua New Guinea when two patrol officers and two policemen were killed.

Several locals were arrested, tried and sentenced to death.

References

History of Papua New Guinea